Slovakian national hockey team may refer to:

 Slovakia national ball hockey team (Men's)
 Slovakia men's national field hockey team
 Slovakia women's national field hockey team
 Slovakia men's national ice hockey team
 Slovakia women's national ice hockey team
 Slovakia men's national inline hockey team